Elizabeth Forsling Harris was a journalist, public relations professional, and the first publisher of Ms. (magazine).

Early life and education 
Harris was from Tennessee. She graduated from Mount Vernon College in Washington, DC.

Career 
Harris worked as a journalist for Newsweek magazine from 1947 to 1951. From 1951 to 1953, she was a television producer for ABC-TV in New York after which she founded a public relations firm in Dallas.

Harris worked for the Peace Corps from 1961 to 1963 and was active in politics. She worked on the campaigns of Lyndon B. Johnson, Sam Rayburn, and John F. Kennedy.

In 1971, Harris co-founded Ms. Magazine and became its first publisher. She published Working Woman Magazine in 1976.

Personal life 
Harris married and divorced Leon Harris, the son of the founder of Neiman Marcus department store.

Death 
Harris died of emphysema on July 14, 1999.

References 

American women journalists
Journalists from Tennessee
1999 deaths
Year of birth missing
Mount Vernon Seminary and College alumni
Newsweek people
Deaths from emphysema
Peace Corps people